Harokopio University of Athens, HUA is a public research university based in Kallithea, Athens, Greece.

Founded in 1990, the 18th state University established in Greece, as the successor of the Harokopios Higher School of Home Economics that was established in 1929. The university has ever since expanded to further scientific areas awarding bachelor's, master's, as well as doctoral degrees. Its small size, with about 120 academic and research staff, 80 administration personnel and 1000 undergraduate students, makes it a flexible academic institution.

History
The university is named after Panagis Harokopos (1835–1911), who took care of the founding and funding of a school oriented towards the production of scientific potential in Home Economics. To achieve his vision he bought a plot of 20,000 m2 in the borough of Kallithea, where between 1915 and 1920 the school was built. A new wing was added in 1959.

This complex of buildings housed the "Harokopios Higher School" until 1990, when the Harokopio University was founded. The development of the university was based on international standards and scientific research that was conducted by the Institute of Regional Development of the Panteion University after request of the Ministry of Education.

Campus

The infrastructure of the university is of high level, in fact it was fully restored in 1993-1994 while a new building was erected in 1999–2000 to house the newly established Geography Department and the library. In 2011 a new building was completed in the area of Tavros, for the newly established Department of Informatics and Telematics and the university's Refrectory.

Research
Harokopio University is active in academic research and teaching in the wider fields of Home Economics and Ecology, Geography, Nutritional Sciences and Dietetics, as well as  Informatics and Telematics, all including – to a larger or smaller extent – the study of the different aspects of the environment. Through research programmes, as well as its extensive ERASMUS educational exchange program, the university has built an extensive network of co-operation with other academic and research institutes and the private sector in Greece, Europe and worldwide.

According to statistics on publications as reported by the National Documentation Center, Harokopio University contributes to the scientific output of Greece.

Academic departments
Today Harokopio University comprises 3 Schools and 4 academic Departments.

Academic evaluation
In 2016 the external evaluation committee gave Harokopio University a Positive evaluation.

An external evaluation of all academic departments in Greek universities was conducted by the Hellenic Quality Assurance and Accreditation Agency (HQA).

Harokopio is currently ranked 351–400th in The Times Higher Education (THE) world university rankings.

See also
 Panteion University, founded in 1927, it is the oldest university of Social and Political Sciences in Greece.
 List of universities in Greece
 List of research institutes in Greece
 European Higher Education Area
 Outline of academic disciplines
 Education in Greece

References

External links
 Harokopio University – Official Website 
 Harokopio University DASTA Office (Career Office and Innovation Unit) 
 Hellenic Quality Assurance and Accreditation Agency (HQA) 
 Study in Greece – Official portal for studies in Greece 
 "ATHENA" Plan for Higher Education   
 Hellenic Academic Libraries Link (HEAL-Link)) 
 Kallipos (e-books Greek academic publishing) 
 Greek Research and Technology Network (GRNET) 
 okeanos (GRNET's cloud service) 

Universities in Greece
Education in Athens
Educational institutions established in 1990
1990 establishments in Greece
Universities and colleges in Attica
Kallithea